Anthony Kumpen (born 3 November 1978) is a Belgian professional racing driver and team manager. Kumpen currently works as the team manager for PK Carsport in the NASCAR Whelen Euro Series. He previously competed full-time in the NASCAR Whelen Euro Series, winning the championship twice in 2014 and 2016. He also joint-held the record of the most 24 Hours of Zolder wins with six.

Racing career

In 1988, Kumpen started kart racing. He moved on to Belcar, the Belgian Racing Car Championship, in 1998, winning the GT2 championship in his first year, and the GT championship in 1999. He won several more Belgian GT and GTA championships over the next decade. In 2000, he won the overall classification at the 24 Hours of Zolder, a feat he would repeat in 2002, 2003, 2004, 2010 and 2012 for a record total of 6 victories.

In 2000, he started competing in the FIA GT Championship for the Paul Belmondo Racing team. His first victory in a race in this championship followed in 2002. More victories followed in 2005 (2), 2006, 2008 and 2009 (2).

He also competed in the 24 Hours of Daytona and the 24 Hours of Le Mans.

In 2014, he competed in the NASCAR Whelen Euro Series for the PK Carsport team, driving a Holden VF Commodore. He won one race in the championship, and ended the season in first place, one point ahead of defending champion Ander Vilariño.

His win gave him a license to compete in the 2015 NASCAR K&N Pro Series East, racing for Bill McAnally. On 7 June, as part of the Nexteer Automotive Road To Daytona program, he announced his intentions to compete in the Xfinity Series, running three races at Iowa Speedway, Phoenix International Raceway and Homestead-Miami Speedway. In 2016, he announced that he would run the Xfinity Series season opener at Daytona for Precision Performance Motorsports, driving the No. 46 Chevy. He continued his part-time slate in the Xfinity Series in 2017, adding two races at Daytona and Mid-Ohio Sports Car Course, driving the No. 46 Chevy for PPM. Kumpen was also in discussions with Rick Ware Racing to make his Monster Energy NASCAR Cup Series debut with the team in 2018, but it never materialised because of his doping suspension (NASCAR is a member of ACCUS, which honours FIA doping suspensions such as the one imposed by the Royal Automobile Club of Belgium).

Kumpen is suspended for four years by the Royal Automobile Club of Belgium after he failed a drug test during the 2018 24 Hours of Zolder. During his suspension, he moved to a management role in PK Carsport and is currently working as the team manager for the Euro Series operations of the team.

Personal life
Kumpen is the son of Paul Kumpen, a former race pilot, Belgian Rallycross Champion 1987 with Porsche 911 BiTurbo 4x4, director of the building company Kumpen, president of VOKA Limburg, and founder of PK Carsport. Paul Kumpen owned 50% of the shares of Ridley Bikes, and Anthony worked as a commercial director for the company, which became the largest bike manufacturer in Belgium. Anthony stayed on at the company after his father sold his share in 2013.

Kumpen lives in Hasselt and is married to Griet Vanhees. They have one child, a son named Henri-Constant. Kumpen has a daughter, Laura, and a stepson, Thibeau, from his and his wife's previous relationships. He is the first cousin of Sophie Kumpen, the mother of the two-time F1 World Champion and 35 time race winner Max Verstappen.

In 2010, Kumpen participated in Sterren op de Dansvloer (the Belgian version of Dancing with the Stars) on vtm. He was voted out of the show in the third episode and finished as 8th out of 10 contestants.

Motorsports career results

NASCAR
(key) (Bold – Pole position awarded by qualifying time. Italics – Pole position earned by points standings or practice time. * – Most laps led.)

Whelen Euro Series – Elite 1

Xfinity Series

K&N Pro Series East

 Season still in progress
 Ineligible for series points

Complete 24 Hours of Le Mans results

References

External links
 Official website
 

1978 births
Living people
Belgian racing drivers
Sportspeople from Hasselt
NASCAR drivers
24 Hours of Le Mans drivers
24 Hours of Spa drivers
Phoenix Racing drivers
Blancpain Endurance Series drivers
W Racing Team drivers